The Count of Hainaut was the ruler of the county of Hainaut, a historical region in the Low Countries (including the modern countries of Belgium, the Netherlands, Luxembourg and parts of northern France and western Germany). In English-language historical sources, the title is often given the older spelling Hainault.

List of counts of Hainaut

10th century

(uncertain) Reginar I (d. 915)
Sigard (fl. 902–920), also Count of Liège
(uncertain) Reginar II (r. 920–after 932)
(uncertain) Reginar III (r. before 940–958)
Godfrey I (r. before 958–964), also Duke of Lower Lotharingia
Richar (r. 964–973), also Count of Liège

The County of Hainaut was then divided between the counties of Mons and Valenciennes.

Counts of Mons
(uncertain) Renaud (r. 973)
Godfrey II "the captive" (r. 974–998)
(uncertain) Reginar IV (r. 998–1013)
Reginar V (r. 1013–1039), acquired the southern part of the Brabant province around 1024
Herman (r. 1039–1051), married Richilde, acquired Valenciennes around 1045 or 1049

Counts and Margraves of Valenciennes
(uncertain) Amaury (fl. 953-973)
(uncertain) Werner (r. 973)
Arnulf of Valenciennes (d. 1011/1012), also probably count of Cambrai 
Baldwin IV (r. 988–1035)
Baldwin V (r. 1035–1045)
 Reginar of Hasnon (d. c. 1049), father of Richilde, Countess of Hainaut (1045-1048/49)
Herman (r. 1039–1051), as husband of Richilde (1048/49-1051)

Valenciennes and Mons are once again reunited in a consolidated County of Hainaut.

House of Flanders

Baldwin I (r. 1051–1070), also Count of Flanders
Arnulf I (r. 1070–1071), son of Baldwin VI, also Count of Flanders
Baldwin II (r. 1071–1098), son of Baldwin I
Baldwin III (r. 1098–1120), son of Baldwin II
Baldwin IV (r. 1120–1171), son of Baldin III
Baldwin V (r. 1171–1195),  son of Baldwin IV, also Count of Flanders from 1191
Baldwin VI (r. 1195–1205), son of Baldwin V, also Count of Flanders and Latin Emperor of Constantinople
Joan (r. 1205–1244), daughter of Baldwin VI, also Countess of Flanders
Margaret I (r. 1244–1253), daughter of Baldwin VI, also Countess of Flanders, married first to Bouchard IV of Avesnes and then William of Dampierre
The Counties of Flanders and Hainaut are claimed by Margaret's sons, the half-brothers John I of Avesnes and William III of Dampierre in the War of the Succession of Flanders and Hainault. In 1246, King Louis IX of France awards Hainaut to John, but Margaret refuses to hand over the government but was forced to do so in 1254 by John and the German anti-king William II, Count of Holland.

House of Avesnes

John I (r. 1253–1257), son of Margaret I and Bouchard IV of Avesnes

House of Flanders

Margaret I (r. 1257–1280), resumed control after John I's death

House of Avesnes

John II (r. 1280–1304), son of John I, also Count of Holland
William I (r. 1304–1337), son of John II, also Count of Holland
William II (r. 1337–1345), son of William I, also Count of Holland
Margaret II (r. 1345–1356), daughter of William I,
jointly with her husband Louis IV, Holy Roman Emperor (d. 1347) and their son William III

House of Bavaria

William III (r. 1345–1389), son of Margaret II and Louis IV
jointly with his brothers Louis the Brandenburger, Louis the Roman and Otto the Bavarian (1347–1349),Stephen II of Bavaria (1347–1353) and Albert I
Margaret returned in 1350 in opposition to her son and held Hainaut until 1356.
Albert I, (Regent since 1358, ruled as count 1389–1404)
William IV (r. 1404–1417), son of Albert I
Jacqueline (r. 1417–1433), daughter of William IVJacqueline was opposed by her uncle John, Duke of Bavaria-Straubing, son of Count Albert I in a war of succession. John's claims devolved upon Philip III, Duke of Burgundy, a nephew of William IV, whose mother had been the sister of William. In April 1433 he forced Jacqueline to abdicate from Hainaut and Holland in his favour.''

House of Burgundy

Philip I the Good (r. 1433–1467)
Charles I the Bold (r. 1467–1477), son of Philip the Good
Mary the Rich (r. 1477–1482), daughter of Charles the Bold, jointly with her husband Maximilian I, Holy Roman Emperor

House of Habsburg

Philip II the Handsome (r. 1482–1506), son of Mary and Maximilian
Charles II (r. 1506–1555), son of Philip, also Holy Roman Emperor (as Charles V)

Charles II proclaimed the Pragmatic Sanction of 1549 eternally uniting Hainaut with the other lordships of the Low Countries in a personal union. When the Habsburg empire was divided among the heirs of Charles V, the Low Countries, including Hainaut, went to Philip II of Spain, of the Spanish branch of the House of Habsburg.

Philip III (r. 1555–1598), son of Charles III, also King of Spain
Isabella Clara Eugenia (r. 1598–1621), daughter of Philip II,
jointly with her husband Albert, Archduke of Austria)
Philip IV (r. 1621–1665), grandson of Philip III, also King of Spain
Charles III (r. 1665–1700), son of Philip IV, also King of Spain

Between 1706 and 1714 the Low Countries were invaded by the English and the Dutch during the War of the Spanish Succession. The fief was claimed by the House of Habsburg and the House of Bourbon. In 1714, the Treaty of Rastatt settled the succession and the County of Hainaut went to the Austrian branch of the House of Habsburg.

Charles IV (r. 1714–1740), great grandson of Philip III, als Holy Roman Emperor (elect)
Mary Theresa (r. 1740–1780), daughter of Charles IV, married Francis I, Holy Roman Emperor
Joseph I (r. 1780–1790), son of Maria Theresa and Francis I, also Holy Roman Emperor
Leopold I (r. 1790–1792), son of Maria Theresa and Francis I, also Holy Roman Emperor
Francis I (r. 1792–1835), son of Leopold I, also Holy Roman Emperor

The title was factually abolished in the aftermath of the French Revolution and the annexation of Flanders by France in 1795.  Although, the title remained officially claimed by the descendants of Leopold I until the reign of Charles I of Austria.

Family tree (1055–1433)

Modern usage

House of Belgium

In the Kingdom of Belgium, the title of Count of Hainaut was traditionally given to the eldest son of the Belgian crown prince, who was himself styled as Duke of Brabant. In 2001, with the birth of Princess Elisabeth of Belgium (now Duchess of Brabant), heir and elder daughter of Prince Philippe, Duke of Brabant (now Philippe, King of the Belgians), it was decided not to feminize and award her the title of Countess of Hainaut, but to abolish the title.

Prince Leopold, Duke of Brabant (1859–1865), son of Leopold II of Belgium
Baudouin I of Belgium (1930–1934), son of Leopold III of Belgium

See also

County of Hainaut

 
 
1071 establishments in Europe
Hainaut

pt:Condado de Hainaut